Setzer is a German and Jewish occupational surname. In Middle High German setzen meant to set prices and referred to a market inspector or a tax official. In Yiddish setser referred to a typesetter. Notable people with the surname include:

Arlene Setzer, American politician
Brian Setzer (born 1959), American guitarist and songwriter
Dennis Setzer, American race car driver
Matthew Setzer, American musician, composer, and music technologist
Mitchell S. Setzer, American politician
Franz Xaver Setzer, actually Franz Anton Adolf (born August 6, 1886, in Vienna, † January 10, 1939 ibid) was an Austrian photographer.

See also
Setzer Gabbiani, character in the video game Final Fantasy VI

References

German-language surnames